Glyphostoma pilsbryi is a species of sea snail, a marine gastropod mollusk in the family Clathurellidae.

Description
The size of an adult shell varies between 8 mm and 15 mm.

Distribution
G. pilsbryi can be found from the eastern coast of Florida to Campeche Bank. The minimum recorded depth is 91 m. The maximum recorded depth is 183 m.

References

External links
 
 Rosenberg G., Moretzsohn F. & García E. F. (2009). Gastropoda (Mollusca) of the Gulf of Mexico, pp. 579–699 in Felder, D.L. and D.K. Camp (eds.), Gulf of Mexico–Origins, Waters, and Biota. Biodiversity. Texas A&M Press, College Station, Texas

pilsbryi
Gastropods described in 1940